"Black Sheep" is a song  written and recorded by Canadian country music artist Dean Brody. It was the fourth single and title track off his extended play Black Sheep.

Background
Brody wrote "Black Sheep" based on personal experience. He said he "often felt like an outsider" at times in his life, both as a child in church, and as an adult being a musician. It was partially inspired by his decision to pursue a career in music. Brody wrote the song in Nashville, where he was living at the time.

Critical reception
"Black Sheep" received generally positive reviews. Nanci Dagg of Canadian Beats Media referred to the track as a "boot-stomping" with an "upbeat tempo [and] meaning that people can relate to". Annie Reuter of Billboard said the song had "inspiring lyrics". Melissa Novacaska of Exclaim! noted the song had a "gospel ring to it".

Music video
The official music video for "Black Sheep" premiered exclusively on Billboard on July 29, 2019. The video was shot in Nashville, Tennessee and directed by Brian Vaughn.

Chart performance
"Black Sheep" reached a peak of number 5 on the Billboard Canada Country chart dated November 30, 2019.

References

2019 songs
2019 singles
Dean Brody songs
Songs written by Dean Brody
Open Road Recordings singles